The Tennessee House of Representatives 28th district in the United States is one of 99 legislative districts included in the lower house of the Tennessee General Assembly. It covers the areas surrounding downtown Chattanooga, along with various outer parts of the city, such as East Chattanooga, Brainerd, and Alton Park. The district stretches far to the east, near Chattanooga Metropolitan Airport; to the north, near the Baylor School; and to the south, ending at the Tennessee-Georgia state line. The district has been represented by Yusuf Hakeem, since 2019.

Demographics 

 60.9% of the district is African American
 32.7% of the district is White
 3.8% of the district is Hispanic
 1.5% of the district is two or more races
 0.8% of the district is Asian
 0.3% of the district is other than listed

List of representatives

Recent election results 
The following are the recent election results for the district. The incumbent representative, Hakeem, has ran unopposed in both primaries and general elections since 2020.

2022

References 

Tennessee General Assembly